Friday Night Lights is the soundtrack for the television series Friday Night Lights, a program inspired by the film of the same name.

Although post-rock band Explosions in the Sky wrote most of the film's soundtrack, the music for the television series was a more accessible affair, with bands such as The Killers and OutKast featuring on it. One Explosions in the Sky track did appear on the soundtrack album, however, with "First Breath After Coma" (from their album The Earth is Not a Cold Dead Place) becoming the album closer.

Track listing
 "Devil Town" - Tony Lucca
 "Read My Mind" - The Killers (Like Rebel Diamonds mix)
 "I Turn My Camera On" - Spoon
 "Idlewild Blues" - OutKast
 "Everything I Do" - Whiskeytown
 "Rewind" - Stereophonics
 "Keep Us Together" - Starsailor
 "Big Big Kid" - Jibbs
 "So Divided" - …And You Will Know Us by the Trail of Dead
 "Goodbye" - Drive-By Truckers
 "Dead Man's Will" - Calexico/Iron & Wine
 "Storm" - José González
 "I Remember" - Chris Brokaw
 "First Breath After Coma" - Explosions in the Sky

References

External links
 Sample a selection of the songs on Indie Shuffle

2007 soundtrack albums
Television soundtracks
Friday Night Lights (TV series)